Them! is a 1954 American black-and-white science fiction monster film from Warner Bros. Pictures, produced by David Weisbart, directed by Gordon Douglas, and starring James Whitmore, Edmund Gwenn, Joan Weldon, and James Arness. The film is based on an original story treatment by George Worthing Yates, which was then developed into a screenplay by Ted Sherdeman and adaptation by Russell Hughes.

Them! is one of the first of the 1950s "nuclear monster" films, and the first "big bug" feature film to use insects as the monster.

A nest of gigantic irradiated ants is discovered in the New Mexico desert; they quickly become a national threat when it is discovered that two young queen ants and their consorts have escaped to establish new nests. The national search that follows finally culminates in a battle with Them in the concrete spillways and storm drain system of Los Angeles.

Plot
New Mexico State Police Sgt. Ben Peterson and Trooper Ed Blackburn discover a little girl in shock and a catatonic state wandering the desert near Alamogordo. They take her to a nearby vacation trailer, located by a police spotter plane, where they find evidence that she had been there when the trailer was attacked and nearly destroyed. It is later discovered that the trailer was owned by an FBI Special Agent named Ellinson, on vacation with his wife, son, and daughter; the other members of the little girl's family remain missing. Now in an ambulance, she briefly reacts to a pulsating high-pitched sound coming from the desert by sitting upright, eyes open, on the stretcher, but no one else notices her reaction, and she lies back down when the noise stops.

At a general store owned by "Gramps" Johnson, Peterson and Blackburn find his dead body and a wall of the store partially torn out. After a quick look-around, Peterson leaves Blackburn behind to secure the crime scene. Blackburn later goes outside to investigate a strange, pulsating sound. Gunshots are heard, the sound becomes faster and louder, and Blackburn goes missing. Peterson's captain later points out that both Johnson and Blackburn had fired their weapons at their attacker. More puzzling is the coroner's report on Johnson's brutal death: a huge amount of formic acid was found in his body.

The FBI sends Special Agent Robert Graham to New Mexico to investigate because one of the missing persons is an FBI Agent. After a strange impression is found in the sand near the Ellisons' trailer, the Department of Agriculture sends myrmecologists Dr. Harold Medford and his daughter, Dr. Pat Medford, to assist with the investigation. The elder Medford exposes the Ellinson girl to formic acid fumes, which releases her from her catatonic state; she screams in panic and yells "Them!". Medford's suspicions of Camponotus vicinus are validated by her reaction, but he will not reveal his theory prematurely.

At the Ellinson campsite, Pat encounters a giant, eight-foot-long foraging ant. Following instructions from the elder Medford, Peterson and Graham shoot off the ant's antennae, blinding it, and kill it using a Thompson submachine gun. Medford finally reveals his theory: a colony of giant ants, mutated by radiation from the first atomic bomb test near Alamogordo, is responsible for the area's deaths. General O'Brien orders an Army helicopter search, and the giant ants' nest is found. Cyanide gas bombs are tossed inside, and Graham, Peterson, and Pat descend into the nest to check for survivors. Deep inside, Pat finds evidence that two queens have hatched and escaped to establish new colonies.

Peterson, Graham, and the Medfords join a government task force that covertly begins to investigate reports of unusual activity. In one, a civilian pilot has been committed to a Texas mental hospital after claiming that he was forced down by UFOs shaped like giant ants. Next, the Coast Guard receives a report of a giant queen hatching her brood in the hold of a freighter at sea in the Pacific; giant ants attack the ship's crew, and there are few survivors. The freighter is later sunk by gunfire from a U.S. Navy cruiser.

A third report of a large sugar theft at a rail yard leads Peterson, Graham, and Major Kibbee to Los Angeles. An alcoholic in a hospital "drunk tank" claims he has seen giant ants outside his window. The mutilated body of a father is recovered, but his two young sons are missing. Peterson, Graham, and Kibbee find evidence that they were flying a model airplane in the Los Angeles River drainage channel near the hospital. Martial law is declared in Los Angeles. California Army National Guard troops of the 40th Infantry Division and U.S. Marines from the 1st Marine Division at Camp Pendleton are assigned to find the ants in the vast storm drain system under the city and wipe them out.

Peterson finds the two missing boys alive, trapped by the ants near their nest. He calls for reinforcements and lifts both boys to safety, just before being attacked and grabbed by a giant ant in its mandibles. Graham arrives with reinforcements and kills the ant, but Peterson dies from his injuries as the ants swarm to protect the nest. Graham and the soldiers fight them off, but a tunnel collapse traps Graham. Several ants charge, but he holds them off with his submachine gun just long enough for troops to break through and save him. The queen and her hatchlings are discovered and quickly dispatched with flamethrowers. As they burn, Dr. Medford offers a philosophic observation: "When Man entered the Atomic Age, he opened the door to a new world. What we may eventually find in that new world, nobody can predict".

Cast
James Whitmore as Sgt. Ben Peterson
Edmund Gwenn as Dr. Harold Medford
Joan Weldon as Dr. Pat Medford
James Arness as FBI Agent Robert Graham
Onslow Stevens as General O'Brien
Sean McClory as Major Kibbee
Chris Drake as Trooper Ed Blackburn
Sandy Descher as Ellinson girl
Mary Alan Hokanson as Mrs. Lodge (credited Mary Ann Hokanson)
Don Shelton as Captain Fred Edwards
Fess Parker as Alan Crotty
Olin Howland as Jensen, the "alcoholic patient" (credited Olin Howlin)

Cast notes
Leonard Nimoy has a small, uncredited part as a U.S. Army staff sergeant in the communications room.
Other actors who appear in small parts include John Beradino, Willis Bouchey, Booth Colman, Richard Deacon, Lawrence Dobkin, Ann Doran, William Schallert, Douglas Spencer, Dub Taylor, Dorothy Green, Harry Wilson, Dick York, Jan Merlin, and Walter Coy.
When casting his planned Davy Crockett episode of the Disneyland television series, Walt Disney viewed the film to see James Arness, who had been recommended for the role. Disney, however, was more impressed by a scene with Fess Parker as an inmate in the mental ward of the Texas hospital. Watching Parker's performance, Disney realized he had found his Davy Crockett. John Wayne saw the film and, impressed with Arness' performance, recommended him for the role of Marshal Matt Dillon in the new Gunsmoke TV series, a role that Arness went on to play from 1955 to 1975.

Production

When Them! began production in the fall of 1953, it was originally conceived to be in 3D and Warner Color. During pre-production, test shots in color and 3D were made. A few color tests of the large-scale ant models were also made, but when it was time to shoot the 3D test, Warner Bros.' "All Media" 3D camera rig malfunctioned and no footage could be filmed. The next day a memo was sent out that the color and 3D aspects of the production were to be scrapped; widescreen black-and-white would now be the film's presentation format. Warner Bros. hoped to emulate the "effective shock treatment" effect of its previous science fiction thriller The Beast From 20,000 Fathoms; ultimately, however, the film was never made in widescreen. Because of the preparation of certain scenes, many of the camera set-ups for 3D remain in the film, like the opening titles and the flamethrowers shots aimed directly at the camera.

Although Warner Bros. was dissatisfied with the color results, the film's titles were printed in vivid red and blue against a black-and-white background to give the film's opening a dramatic "punch". This effect was achieved by an Eastman Color section spliced into each release print. The 1985 VHS tape release, the subsequent LaserDisc and later DVD release have retained this black-and-white-with-two-color title effect.

The entrance to the ants' final nest was filmed along the concrete spillways of the Los Angeles River, between the First and Seventh Street Bridges, east of downtown. The depiction of the Chihuahuan Desert of southern New Mexico is actually the Mojave Desert near Palmdale, California. Mercy Hospital was a real institution and is now Brownsville Medical Center.

James Whitmore wore "lifts" in his shoes to compensate for the height difference between himself and James Arness. Whitmore also employed bits of "business" (hand gestures and motions) during scenes in which he appeared to draw more attention to his character when not speaking.

The Wilhelm scream, created three years earlier for the film Distant Drums, is used during the action sequences: when a sailor aboard the freighter is grabbed by an ant, when James Whitmore's character is caught in an ant's mandibles, and when an overhead wooden beam falls on a soldier in the Los Angeles storm drain sequence.

The giant ants, painted a purplish-green color, were constructed and operated by unseen technicians supervised by Ralph Ayers. During the climactic battle sequence in the Los Angeles sewers, there is a brief shot of one ant moving in the foreground with its side removed, revealing its mechanical interior. This blunder has been obscured in the DVD releases of the film.

The film poster shows a gigantic ant with menacing cat-like eyes rather than the normal compound eyes of an ant.

The sounds the giant ants emit in the film were the calls of bird-voiced tree frogs mixed in with the calls of a wood thrush, hooded warbler, and red-bellied woodpecker. It was recorded at Indian Island, Georgia, on April 11, 1947, by the Cornell Lab of Ornithology.

Reception

Them! was released in June 1954, and by the end of that year had accrued $2 million (US) in distributors' domestic (U.S. and Canada) rentals, making it the year's 51st biggest earner. According to an article in Slate, this was Warner Bros. highest-grossing film that year. However, 1954 In Film lists two other films from Warner Bros. that earned more in gross.

From contemporary reviews, the Monthly Film Bulletin stated that despite the science fiction film genre being new it had developed several sub-divisions including "the other-worldly, the primeval-monstrous, the neo-monstrous, the planetary-visitant, etc." and that "Them! is a "well-built example of the neo-monstrous", "less absurdly sensational than most" Discussing the ant monsters in the film, the review referred to them as "reasonably horrible--they do not entirely avoid the impression of mock-up that is almost inevitable when over-lifesize creatures have to be constructed and moved" while noting that they were "considerably more conceivable than those prehistoric remnants that have recently been emerging from bog and iceberg". The review commented on the cast as "like most science-fiction, [the film] is on the whole serviceably rather than excitingly cast" and the crew was noted, stating the direction was "smoothly machined" and the film has "decent writing" though "more short cuts might have been [taken]", finding that the start of the film was too slow. A. H. Weiler's review in The New York Times noted "... from the moment James Whitmore, playing a New Mexico state trooper, discovers a six-year-old moppet wandering around the desert in a state of shock, to the time when the cause of that mental trauma is traced and destroyed, Them! is taut science fiction". The reviewer in Variety opined it was a "top-notch science fiction shocker. It has a well-plotted story, expertly directed and acted in a matter-of-fact style to rate a chiller payoff and thoroughly satisfy the fans of hackle-raising melodrama". John McCarten of The New Yorker wrote, "If you're willing to let your imagination off its leash, you may have a fairly good time at 'Them!'"

Since its original release, Them! has become generally regarded as one of the best science fiction films of the 1950s. Bill Warren described it as " ... tight, fast-paced and credible ... [T]he picture is suspenseful". Phil Hardy's The Aurum Film Encyclopedia: Science Fiction noted, "Directed by [Gordon] Douglas in semi-documentary fashion, Them! is one of the best American science fiction films of the fifties". Danny Peary believed the film "Ranks with The Thing and Invasion of the Body Snatchers as the best of the countless '50s science fiction films". In the Time Out Film Guide, David Pirie wrote, "By far the best of the 50s cycle of 'creature features' ... retains a good part of its power today". The review aggregator website Rotten Tomatoes reported a 93% approval rating with an average rating of 7.6/10, based on 57 reviews. The website's consensus reads, "One of the best creature features of the early atomic age, Them! features effectively menacing special effects and avoids the self-parody that would taint later monster movies".

Them! was nominated for an Oscar for its special effects (but the award went to 20,000 Leagues Under the Sea) and won a Golden Reel Award for best sound editing.

In popular culture
A Far Side comic strip referenced it, in which a businessman opens a conference room door to reveal the ants, before turning to his colleagues and saying, "It's 'Them', gentlemen."
Van Morrison's band Them was named after this film though the band member that came up with the name was not Van Morrison but Eric Wrixon.
Joey and Chandler watch the film on TV in the 1995 Friends episode "The One Where Rachel and Ross... You Know".
New Jersey punk band the Misfits has a song titled "Them!", with lyrics directly inspired by the film, on their release Famous Monsters (1999).
The video game series It Came from the Desert was inspired by Them!
Eight Legged Freaks features a scene in which sequences from the film are included.
Lilo & Stitch 2: Stitch Has a Glitch features the film on a TV that Lilo, Stitch, Nani and David watch along with Jumba and Pleakley.
Fallout 3, which takes place in a post-apocalyptic irradiated wasteland, has a side-quest involving giant mutated fire ants titled "Those!" in homage to the film.
In Tim Burton's film Ed Wood, Bela Lugosi (Martin Landau) explains to Ed (Johnny Depp), "Nobody wants vampires anymore. Now all they want is giant bugs". The scene takes place in 1952, but the actual film came out two years later.
In the 1950s E.C. Comics parody comic, Panic, a companion to the highly successful Mad, there is a parody titled "Them! There! Those!" featuring art by Wally Wood.
The 1960s Remco toy line titled Hamilton Invaders featured giant bugs versus military defenders. One of the larger mechanical bugs, "The Spooky Spider", was designed after the giant ants in Them!. Another creature in this line also featured a giant bug, called "Horrible Hamilton", designed after the giant wasps from the 1950s feature Monster from Green Hell.
The scene where Pat is attacked by the foraging ant appears as a replay in the 2018 Marvel film Ant-Man and the Wasp.

Remake
On January 4, 2023, it was revealed that Academy Award winning film composer Michael Giacchino would make his feature directorial debut with a remake of Them! for Warner Bros. Pictures.

Notes

References

Bibliography

External links

Rerecording of Them! soundtrack

1954 films
1954 horror films
1950s monster movies
1950s science fiction horror films
American black-and-white films
American science fiction horror films
American monster movies
American natural horror films
1950s English-language films
Fictional ants
Fictional entomologists
Films about ants
Films about technological impact
Films directed by Gordon Douglas
Films scored by Bronisław Kaper
Films set in deserts
Films set in Los Angeles
Films set in New Mexico
Films shot in New Mexico
Warner Bros. films
Films about size change
Giant monster films
1950s American films